Brent Lakatos (born 1 June 1980) is a Canadian wheelchair racer in the T53 classification. Lakatos has represented Canada at three Summer Paralympics, and at the 2012 Games he won three silver medals in the sprint and mid-distance events. In 2013 Lakatos reached the pinnacle of his sport when he collected four gold medals at the IPC Athletics World Championships and became world champion at his classification in the 100m, 200m and 400m events.

Personal history
Lakatos came from a sporting family and was swimming by the age of four. When he was six years-old a freak ice-skating accident resulted in the formation of a blood clot on his spine that left his legs paralyzed.

Lakatos is married to Great Britain Paralympic sprinter and long jumper, Stefanie Reid and as of 2012 they live together in Britain.

Athletics career
Although Lakatos had taken part in racing events during the summer months since 1996, he did not initially take to athletics and was far more interested in wheelchair basketball, playing for the University of Texas at Arlington. Eight months before the 2004 Summer Paralympics in Athens, Lakatos decided to switch sports permanently to wheelchair racing. At that time Lakatos was competing as a T54 athlete having not yet received an International IPC Classification. In 2004 he finally qualified and was selected for the 2004 Summer Paralympics, this was quite an accomplishment for him in the T54 class, a class he was incorrectly placed in. He raced in the 100m, 200m, 4 × 100 m relay and 4 × 400 m relay, though he failed to qualify for the finals in the solo events and in the relays Canada came fourth in the finals of the 4 × 100 m and were disqualified in the 4 × 400 m.

Lakatos' career changed when receiving his International IPC Classification at the 2004 Paralympics, he was reclassified as a T53 racer. He now found that instead of struggling to just qualify he was now one of the fastest athletes in his new class and in 2007 he was breaking Canadian wheelchair sprint records.

Lakatos again qualified for the Canadian team in the 2008 Summer Paralympics in Beijing. He was entered for the 100m, 200m and 400 m T53 events, and whereas in 2004 he failed to qualify for the finals, he now qualified for all three finals. Despite his best efforts, Lakatos could only finish between 5th and 6th in all three final races. Lakatos bettered these results when he raced in the 2011 IPC Athletics World Championships, finishing third in the 100m and second in the 200m finals.

By 2012 Lakatos was a major challenger for gold medals in his T53 events. In the 2012 Summer Paralympics in London he took three silver medals; in the 200m, 400m and 800m. In the 200m and 400m finals he was beaten by China's Li Huzhao, while in the 800m he was just 11 hundredths of a second behind Richard Colman of Australia. The next year Lakatos stamped his mark on the international stage when he won five medals, four of them gold at the 2013 IPC Athletics World Championships, becoming world champion in the 100, 200 and 400m.  Then the day after the World Championships he competed in the Sainsbury Anniversary Games in London, setting the World Record in the 100m with a time 14.34s.

In 2020, Lakatos won the 400 metres wheelchair race at the 2020 British Athletics Championships. Later in the year, he won the 2020 London Marathon in a time of 1:36:04.

In 2021, Lakatos took place in the 2020 Tokyo Paralympic Games where he ranked three times second, earning silver medals in the 100m T53, the 400m T53 and the 5000m T53.

References

External links
 
 
 
  

1980 births
Living people
People with paraplegia
Olympic wheelchair racers of Canada
Paralympic gold medalists for Canada
Paralympic silver medalists for Canada
Paralympic bronze medalists for Canada
Athletes (track and field) at the 2004 Summer Paralympics
Athletes (track and field) at the 2008 Summer Paralympics
Athletes (track and field) at the 2012 Summer Paralympics
Athletes (track and field) at the 2016 Summer Paralympics
Canadian male wheelchair racers
Canadian people of Hungarian descent
Paralympic wheelchair racers
Medalists at the 2012 Summer Paralympics
Medalists at the 2016 Summer Paralympics
World Para Athletics Championships winners
Paralympic medalists in athletics (track and field)
Paralympic track and field athletes of Canada
Medalists at the 2015 Parapan American Games
Athletes (track and field) at the 2020 Summer Paralympics
British Athletics Championships winners
People from Dorval